Colonel John Everett Lyle Streight  (August 15, 1880 – June 2, 1955) was a Canadian lumber merchant, military officer and politician.

Biography 
Streight's was born and kept a home in Islington, Ontario (now part of Toronto) throughout his life. He joined the army at the age of 18, beginning a 46-year military career in which he was awarded the Military Cross. He fought in the South African War at the dawn of the 20th century and also saw action in World War I in which he was captured and became a prisoner of war.

In the 1930s he served as aide-de-camp to the Governor General of Canada and, in 1932, served as aide-de-camp to King George V.

Streight first ran for federal office in the 1921 federal election as a Liberal but was defeated in his York West by Henry Lumley Drayton. He was elected to the House of Commons of Canada on his second attempt, 14 years later, in the 1935 federal election winning by 60 votes. In 1937, he was a member of the Canadian contingent attending the coronation of King George VI. That year, he turned down an invitation from Adolf Hitler to speak to German youth on the need to establish an equivalent to the Canadian Legion. He retired from politics in 1940.

References

External links
ETOBICOKE HISTORY CORNER: Col. Streight led an honourable life in Islington

1880 births
1955 deaths
Canadian Army officers
Canadian prisoners of war in World War I
World War I prisoners of war held by Germany
Canadian military personnel of the Second Boer War
Canadian military personnel of World War I
Liberal Party of Canada MPs
Members of the House of Commons of Canada from Ontario
Military personnel from Toronto
People from Etobicoke
Politicians from Toronto

Canadian Militia officers
Queen's Own Rifles of Canada officers
Governor General's Horse Guards